The county governor of Oslo og Viken county in Norway represents the central government administration in the county.

Viken county (with its current borders) was established on 1 January 2020 after the merger of the old Buskerud, Akershus, and Østfold counties. The county-municipality of Oslo was not involved in this county merger, however, the Akershus and Oslo had been sharing a county governor since 1917. In preparation for the county merger, the government of Norway merged the offices of County Governor of Østfold, County Governor of Buskerud, and County Governor of Oslo og Akerhus into one office starting on 1 January 2019.

The county governor is the government's representative in the county. The governor carries out the resolutions and guidelines of the Storting and government. This is done first by the county governor performing administrative tasks on behalf of the ministries. Secondly, the county governor also monitors the activities of the municipalities and is the appeal body for many types of municipal decisions.

Name
The title of the office was originally  but on 1 January 2021, the title was changed to the gender-neutral .

List of county governors
Oslo og Viken has had the following governors:

See also
For the county governors of this area prior to 2020, see: 
List of county governors of Akershus
List of county governors of Buskerud
List of county governors of Østfold

References

Oslo og Viken